Narayanapur is a village situated 3 kilometres away from Basavakalyan taluk of Bidar district in the Indian state of Karnataka.

History
The village is mentioned as Tribhuvana Tilaka Shri Rama Narayanapura, Rayanarayanapura and Viranarayanapura.

Shiva Temple
Narayanapur is famous for the ancient 12th century Shiva temple, built during the Chalukyan reign located in the village. In addition, there are few other temples like Bhagyavanti Temple, Lakshmi Temple, Bhavani Temple, Hanuman Temples are there in Narayanpur.

JNV ( Jawahar Navodaya Vidyalaya ) BIDAR
JNV or Javahar Navodaya Vidyalaya (An autonomous body of Human resource and development ministry, govt of India) Bidar is a premier educational institute located near the village.

Schools in Narayanpur
 Vidyaniketan P. S, Narayanpur
 Govt Mps, Narayanpur

Demographics
 India census, Narayanapur had a population of 8677 with 4486 males and 4191 females.

Transport 
Narayanapur is 3 km from Taluka headquarter Basavakalyan.  It is well connected by road to Basavakalyan. Nearest major railway station is in Bidar which is 83 kilo metres from village. Nearest Domestic airport is Bidar which is 83 kms, nearest international airport is Hyderabad, which is 180 kms from the village.

See also
 Bhalki
 Aurad
 Humnabad
 Bidar

References

External links
 http://Bidar.nic.in/

Villages in Bidar district
Western Chalukya Empire
Chalukya dynasty